Königsfeld may refer to several places:

In Germany:
 Königsfeld, Mecklenburg-Vorpommern in the Nordwestmecklenburg district in Mecklenburg-Vorpommern
 Königsfeld, Saxony in the Mittweida district in Saxony
 Königsfeld, Rhineland-Palatinate in Brohltal, Ahrweiler in Rhineland-Palatinate
 Königsfeld, Bavaria in the district of Bamberg in Bavaria
 Königsfeld im Schwarzwald in Schwarzwald-Baar-Kreis in Baden-Württemberg
 Ennepetal-Königsfeld, a borough of Ennepetal

In the Czech Republic:
 Anenská Studánka, in Ústí nad Orlicí District (Bohemia)
 Brno-Královo Pole, in Brno-City District (Moravia)

In Ukraine:
 German name of Ust-Chorna (Усть-Чорна) oblast Transkarpatien, rajon Tjatschiw